Patricia Fitzgibbon is a former camogie player, winner of an All Ireland senior medal in 1992 and winner of the AIB Gaelic Star award for Camogie Junior Player of the year in 1984.

References

External links
 Camogie.ie Official Camogie Association Website

Cork camogie players
Living people
Year of birth missing (living people)